Sandeep Kumar is an Indian politician who served as minister of SC/ST Welfare and Women and Child Welfare in the Delhi government, under the Chief Minister of Delhi, Arvind Kejriwal. He was the youngest minister in Kejriwal's cabinet during his tenure. He was a member of the Aam Aadmi Party. He represents Sultan Pur Majra (Assembly constituency) in the Sixth Legislative Assembly of Delhi.

Kumar was removed from his cabinet post and expelled from his party by Kejriwal on 31 August 2016 after he allegedly appeared in a sex tape.

Early life and education
Sandeep Kumar is a son of Zile Singh. He is resident in the Sultanpur area in Delhi. He completed his 12th standard in 2001, under the CBSE board of Delhi. He acquired a Bachelor of Arts (BA) from Dyal Singh college, University of Delhi in 2004. He gained an LLB degree from the Chaudhary Charan Singh University, Meerut in 2009. He is married to Ritu Verma, who is a housewife.

Political career
A lawyer, Kumar fought cases for economically and socially backward people, without taking any fees. He first met Arvind Kejriwal, who was later instrumental in founding the AAP, during the India Against Corruption movement in 2012.

Kumar contested the 2013 Delhi Legislative Assembly elections as an AAP member in the Sultan Pur Majra Assembly constituency, which is reserved for Scheduled Caste candidates. He secured 30,346 votes, finishing second to the sitting Member of the Legislative Assembly (MLA), Jai Kishan of the Indian National Congress (INC), by a margin of 1,112 votes.

The AAP renominated Kumar for the constituency in the 2015 Delhi Legislative Assembly elections. He won with 80,269 votes. He defeated Kishan, who finished third, by 64,439 votes and also Parbhu Dayal, a Municipal Corporation of Delhi councillor of the Bharatiya Janata Party (BJP). Polling the highest percentage margin of any winning candidate, at 56 per cent, he was described as a "giant killer" by The Financial Express for defeating the four-times elected Kishan.

After the AAP's defeat in Delhi in the 2014 Indian general election, where all seven Delhi seats were won by BJP, Kumar and other volunteers were credited with revival at the grass-root levels. He conducted several corner meetings and organised door-to-door voter connect campaign to increase the voter base in North West Delhi. His elevation as minister of SC/ST Welfare and Women and Child Welfare, in Kejriwal's cabinet was regarded as a recognition of his efforts for the party. The ministry was previously held by Rakhi Birla, who courted controversy in the last Kejriwal cabinet. He was also placed in charge of the social welfare and language ministries. With average age of 42 years, the cabinet was described as the "youngest" in the country, and 34-year-old Kumar was its youngest member.

Kumar was removed by Delhi Chief Minister Arvind Kejriwal on 31 August 2016 after he received a sex CD showing Kumar in a compromising position having sex with two women. Kumar was arrested by Delhi Police on 3 September 2016 after a woman alleged he had spiked her drink, raped her and secretly filmed her. His membership of the AAP was suspended. He was subsequently expelled from the AAP and in September 2016 was placed in judicial custody for a fortnight. He was granted bail in November 2016, with the judge noting that any trial would have to determine several possible explanations for the actions that were claimed to be rape.

Still a sitting member of the Assembly, it was alleged in April 2017 that Kumar had been voicing support for a BJP candidate in the then municipal council election campaign. The BJP distance themselves from the story, claiming that it was an attempt by the AAP to smear them.

See also

Delhi Legislative Assembly
Government of India
Politics of India

Electoral performance

References 
 

Aam Aadmi Party politicians from Delhi
Living people
Delhi MLAs 2015–2020
Delhi MLAs 2020–2025
1980 births